Destry Rides Again is a 1932 American pre-Code Western movie starring Tom Mix and directed by Benjamin Stoloff, about a man framed for a crime he didn't commit, who returns to wreak havoc following his release from prison. The film was based on a novel by Max Brand. The supporting cast includes Claudia Dell, ZaSu Pitts, and Francis Ford.

The film has sometimes been retitled Justice Rides Again for television broadcasts, to avoid confusion with the 1939 film of the same name, with Marlene Dietrich and James Stewart. The latter, however, shares only the title; it is a completely different story that has no connection with Max Brand's novel.

Cast
Tom Mix as Tom Destry
Claudia Dell as Sally Dangerfield
ZaSu Pitts	as Temperance Worker
Stanley Fields as Sheriff Jerry Wendell
Earle Foxe	as Tom Brent
Edward Peil Sr. as Frank Warren
Francis Ford as Judd Ogden
Fred Howard as Edward Clifton 
George Ernest as Willie
Edward LeSaint as Mr. Dangerfield
Charles K. French as Jury Foreman 
Harry Tenbrook as Barfly (uncredited)

See also
Tom Mix filmography

External links

1932 films
1932 Western (genre) films
Films directed by Benjamin Stoloff
Films based on American novels
Films based on Western (genre) novels
Universal Pictures films
American Western (genre) films
American black-and-white films
1930s American films
Films with screenplays by Richard Schayer